The 2011–12 National First Division, is the season from September 2011 until May 2012, of South Africa's second tier of professional football. By the end of the season, the overall NFD champion will get promoted to the first level, known as Premier Soccer League (PSL).

For the first time since the 2003–04 National First Division season, all teams have been placed in one unified league table. Previously the competition had been split into two 'streams'.

Summary 
At the conclusion of the season Tuks FC secured their promotion to the PSL after topping the table. Second-placed Chippa United and third-placed Thanda Royal Zulu were joined by Santos of the PSL in a three team promotion and relegation playoff. At the conclusion of the playoffs Chippa United had secured their promotion to the PSL, in the process relegating Santos to the National First Division. This would be Chippa United's second successive promotion as they had only just earned promotion to the National First Division. What made Chippa United's promotion all the more special is that the club was only established in 2010.

Atlie FC and Carara Kicks were relegated at the end of the season.

League table

PSL playoff tournament
The teams that finished second and third during the 2011-12 National First Division season were joined by the team that finished 15th in the 2011–12 Premier Soccer League season in a 3-team promotion and relegation playoff called the PSL Playoff Tournament.

Participants

Format 
The 3 teams participated in a mini-league in which they played one another twice (home and away) with log points being awarded for winning a match (3 points) and drawing a match (1 point). At the conclusion of the mini-league phase the team that was in first place would either earn or maintain their place in the PSL for the 2012–13 season. If the team that finished 15th in the PSL was unable to win the mini-league, they were relegated to the National First Division for the 2012-13 season.

Playoff table 
At the conclusion of the PSL Playoff Tournament Chippa United had topped the mini-league after defeating Santos 4-3 in the final game, earning their place in the PSL for the 2012-13 season. As they were unable to win the mini-league, Santos failed to maintain their place in the PSL and were relegated to the National First Division for the 2012-13 season.

Results

Player eligibility dispute

Carara Kicks fielded a player who had not been properly registered by the club and appeared in league games. As a result, Carara Kicks had 18 points removed from their total and were relegated.

References

External links
PSL.co.za

National First Division seasons
South
2011–12 in South African soccer leagues